Taste Buddies is a Philippine television lifestyle informative show broadcast by GMA News TV and GTV. Originally hosted by Solenn Heussaff and Isabelle Daza, it premiered on GMA News TV on October 27, 2012. In February 2021, GMA News TV was rebranded as GTV, with the show being carried over. The show concluded on June 26, 2022. Heusaff and Gil Cuerva served as the final hosts.

Premise
The show features discovery journeys in new things about food, events, places and adventures.

Hosts
 Solenn Heussaff 
 Isabelle Daza 
 Iya Villania 
 Rhian Ramos 
 Gil Cuerva 

Segment host
 Arra San Agustin

Production
The production was halted in March 2020 due to the enhanced community quarantine in Luzon caused by the COVID-19 pandemic. The show resumed its programming on November 7, 2020.

Accolades

References

External links
 

2012 Philippine television series debuts
2022 Philippine television series endings
Filipino-language television shows
GMA News TV original programming
GTV (Philippine TV network) original programming
Philippine television shows
Television productions suspended due to the COVID-19 pandemic